Mari Abel (born on 14 January 1975 in Rapla) is an Estonian actress.

In 2004 she graduated from the Estonian Academy of Music and Theatre. Since 2004 she worked at the Von Krahl Theatre. Later, she became a freelance actress. Besides theatre roles she has played also in several films and on television.

Filmography

 2011: Kõks
 2013: Kohtumõistja
 2013: Free Range: Ballaad maailma heakskiitmisest
 2014: Nullpunkt
 2016: Luuraja ja luuletaja
 2016: Teesklejad
 2017: Heleni sünnipäev
 2017: November 
 2018: Pank
 2021: Sandra saab tööd

References

Living people
1975 births
Estonian stage actresses
Estonian film actresses
Estonian television actresses
21st-century Estonian actresses
Estonian Academy of Music and Theatre alumni
People from Rapla